Michael J. Collins (1 November 1940 – 3 December 2022) was an Irish politician who served as a Teachta Dála (TD) for Limerick West from 1997 to 2007. He was a member of Fianna Fáil until 2002, when he became independent.

Early life
Michael Collins was born in Abbeyfeale, County Limerick, in 1940. He was the son of James Collins and a brother of Gerry Collins, both Fianna Fáil members of Dáil Éireann.

Career
Collins was involved in local politics for many years, serving as a member and chairman of the Limerick County Council. He was first elected to Dáil Éireann at the 1997 general election as a Fianna Fáil TD and held his seat until retiring at the 2007 general election citing health reasons. His nephew, Niall Collins was elected to succeed him, maintaining the family's continuous occupation of a seat in that constituency since the 1948 general election. His son, James Collins, is a Fianna Fáil councillor on Limerick City and County Council representing Limerick City West and served as Mayor of Limerick from 2018 to 2019.

Tax evasion
Collins hit the headlines in 2003, when it was revealed that he had set up a bogus offshore account to evade paying tax. He settled the bill with the Revenue Commissioners, paying over €130,000 in taxes, interest and penalties. He also resigned from the Fianna Fáil parliamentary party after it emerged he was on a list of tax defaulters.

On 11 July 2006, Collins appeared in Rathkeale District Court charged with two tax offences: cheating the Collector General and obtaining a tax clearance certificate by false pretences. He was remanded on bail until 28 September 2006, when he was due to appear at Limerick District Court. On 9 January 2007, the court adjourned the case until after the general election of that year.

On 28 September 2007, after just under an hour of deliberation, a jury of seven men and five women returned its verdict. Collins was found guilty of obtaining a tax clearance certificate under false pretences.

Response of Standards Commission
Collins provided a Tax Clearance Certificate and a Statutory Declaration to the Standards Commission on 14 June 2002, as evidence of his compliance with the Tax Acts.

In September 2003, Collins's name appeared in Iris Oifigiúil, the state gazette, as the holder of a bogus non-resident bank account. The Standards Commission sought legal advice and were advised that in the absence of a complaint, it did not have the legal authority to investigate Collins. The Commission advised the Minister for Finance of the limitations of the Ethics Acts which had been exposed through this matter.

Subsequently, the Chairman of the Committee on Members' Interests of Dáil Éireann made a written complaint and the Committee determined that an investigation be carried out by the commission on foot of this. The investigation commenced but has been suspended pending the outcome of the Garda investigation and legal proceedings. The Standards Commission is concerned at the length of time this matter has been under consideration and urges that it be resolved without delay.

Death
Collins died on 3 December 2022, at the age of 82.

See also
Families in the Oireachtas

References

 

1940 births
2022 deaths
Fianna Fáil TDs
Independent TDs
Members of the 28th Dáil
Members of the 29th Dáil
Local councillors in County Limerick
Irish people convicted of tax crimes